Gunnar Carl Andreas Olram (19 December 1908 – 12 January 2001) was a Norwegian actor and stage instructor.

He was born in Halden. He made his stage debut at Centralteatret in 1930. From 1931 to 1934 he worked at Oscarsteatern, and from 1934 to 1944 he was back at Centralteatret. From 1945 to 1950 he was assigned at Studioteatret, and later at Folketeatret, Oslo Nye Teater and Nationaltheatret. Among his stage productions was Nils Kjær's play Det lykkelige valg.

External links

References 

1908 births
2001 deaths
People from Halden
Norwegian male stage actors
Norwegian male film actors
Norwegian male television actors
Norwegian expatriates in Sweden
20th-century Norwegian male actors